Israel Chamber Orchestra (abbreviation ICO, Hebrew: התזמורת הקאמרית הישראלית) (Hatizmoret hakamerit) is an Israeli orchestra based in Tel Aviv. Primary funding comes from the Israel Ministry of Education and the Tel Aviv-Yafo Municipality.

History
Gary Bertini founded the orchestra in 1965 and was its first artistic director, for 10 years.  The ICO's first US appearance was in New York in 1969.  Luciano Berio was the ICO's artistic director in 1975.  Rudolf Barshai led the ICO from 1976 to 1981.  Other leaders of the orchestra have included Uri Segal, Yoav Talmi (1984-1988), and Shlomo Mintz (1989-1993).  Philippe Entremont was artistic director from 1995 to 1998, and is now the ICO's conductor laureate.  

Noam Sheriff was the ICO's music director from 2002 to 2005.  Gil Shohat succeeded Sheriff as artistic director and chief conductor from 2005 to 2008.  In 2009, Roberto Paternostro was appointed as the ICO's musical adviser, and Elizabeth Wallfisch was named the orchestra's baroque program adviser.  In February 2013, Yoav Talmi returned to the ICO as its music director, but resigned in 2014. Since 2015 the orchestra is led by the conductor Ariel Zuckermann.

The ICO has recorded with such labels as Chandos, Naxos (music of Alberto Ginastera), Musicmasters, Koch and Teldec (music of Schoenberg and Tchaikovsky).

See also
Music of Israel
Culture of Israel

References

External links
 
 8593 Chandos CHAN 8593, information on ICO recording of Ernest Bloch, Samuel Barber, Edvard Grieg, and Giacomo Puccini string works
 Naxos 8.572249, information on Ginastera recording

Israeli orchestras
Musical groups established in 1965
Centaur Records artists